Corythophora labriculata is a species of woody plant in the Lecythidaceae family. It is found only in Suriname.

References

Lecythidaceae
Flora of Suriname
Vulnerable plants
Taxonomy articles created by Polbot